Portsmouth Olympic Harbour is a harbour located in Kingston, Ontario. For the 1976 Summer Olympics in Montreal, it hosted the sailing events.

Portsmouth Harbour was constructed in the 1800s to supply coal and materials to Kingston Penitentiary.  CORK, then known as Canadian Olympic-Training Regatta Kingston began in 1969. The success of CORK was a key element in bringing the 1976 Olympics to Kingston. The harbour was significantly modified and refurbished in 1974 and 1975. Since then, it  has played host to the Canadian Olympic-training Regatta, Kingston (CORK), an annual event.

References

Venues of the 1976 Summer Olympics
Olympic sailing venues
Sports venues in Ontario
Sports venues in Kingston, Ontario
Sports venues completed in 1969